A devak, in Maratha people of Maharashtra, India culture, is a family guardian or totem in the form of a physical object, such as a tree.  Some sources define devak as being distinct from the more generic word totem.
The word Devak implies god.
The devak plays an important role in Maratha marriages, as traditionally a man may not marry a woman whose paternal-lineage totem is the same as his own.

See also
Pole worship

References

Culture of Maharashtra
Indian culture